Puerto Rico Highway 164 (PR-164) is the main road from Naranjito to Corozal. It begins at the intersection of PR-167 and PR-148, to reach the center of Naranjito. Then it goes to Corozal across the PR-5 (to Bayamón), PR-152 (to Barranquitas) and PR-165 (to Toa Alta) to finish in the PR-159 in Corozal.

Major intersections

See also

 List of highways numbered 164

References

External links
 

164